Abdul Qadir al-Allam (October 1919 – 8 July 2003) was a Libyan politician. He held several ministerial posts;
Minister of Agriculture of Cyrenaica emirate (March 1950 – December 1951).
Defense minister of Libya (October 1956 – May 1957).
Transport minister of Libya (May 1957 – April 1958).
Economy  minister of Libya (September – October 1960).
Foreign  minister of Libya (October – May 1961).

Biography 
He was Minister of Agriculture and Forestry at the time of the Government of the Emirate of Berqa (March 1950 – December 1951), that is to say until the independence of Libya. 

He served as Minister of Defense under the reign of Mustapha Ben Halim (October 1956 – May 1957), then transport during the reign of Abdel-Majid Kabbar (May 1957 – April 1958) and then from the economy to the last Government days (September – October 1960). 

He assumed the functions of Minister of Foreign Affairs at the beginning of the reign of Mohamed Osman Al-Sayad (October 1960 – May 1961).

Notes

Defence ministers of Libya
Transport ministers of Libya
Foreign ministers of Libya
1919 births
2003 deaths